Hawas is a 1974 Indian Hindi-language film produced, directed, and written by Sawan Kumar, the film stars Anil Dhawan, Neetu Singh, Bindu, Vinod Mehra and Rekha makes a special appearance in the song "Aao Yaro Gao". The film's music is by Usha Khanna.

Plot 
Handsome and fairly good-looking Anil Kumar is employed with Natwarlal, a criminal gangster. Natwarlal asks Anil to find employment with Shailendra Singh, and after doing so, seduce his beautiful young daughter, Neetu Singh, marry her, and thus get himself a stake in their property and wealth. Anil agrees to do so, and does find employment with Shailendra. What he had not counted on was Shailendra's second wife, Kamini, who has an agenda of her own, and who decides to keep Anil for herself.

Cast 
 Anil Dhawan as Anil Kumar
 Neetu Singh as Neetu Singh
 Bindu as Kamini 
 Vinod Mehra as Dr. Bali
 Vidya Sinha as Vidya Kumar
 Faryal as Priya
 Pradeep Kumar as Shailendra Singh
 Randhawa as Man hired by Kamini to put on an act
 Mehmood as Inspector Mehmood
 Pinchoo Kapoor as Natwarlal (Boss)
 Gurcharan Pohli as Shera- Kamini's associate (Credited as Shera)
 Ashok Khanna as Ashok
 Randhir as Mr.Mehta owner of Dadaji Dhakji Cars
 Asit Sen as Dhanabhai Meenawala
 Sawan Kumar Tak man posing as Anil Kumar who buys necklace for Priya
 Neelam Kothari
 Neelu
 Sharmilee
 Jugnu as Jugnu
 Brahm Bhardwaj as Mr. Bhatnagar (uncredited)
 Rekha as Guest appearance in song "Aao Yaro Gao"
 Shiv Kumar as Lallu kumar

Production 
The song "Aao Yaaron Gao Naacho" was initially planned to feature Faryal as the main dancer, but after Rekha heard the song, asked to feature in it since she liked the tune. The costume that Rekha wears in the song was designed by herself.

Soundtrack 
The music was composed by Usha Khanna and lyrics were by Sawan Kumar.

The song "Teri Galiyon Men" was listed at #10 on Binaca Geetmala annual list 1974.

Accolades
Rafi received a Film World Magazine Award for best male singer for the song "Teri Galiyon Mein". The film received Filmfare Award nominations for Best Supporting Actress (Bindu) and Best Female Playback Singer (Asha Bhosle) for the song "Yeh Hawas Kya Hai".

References

External links 
 

1974 films
1970s Hindi-language films
Films scored by Usha Khanna
Films directed by Saawan Kumar Tak